Maitreya-nātha (c. 270–350 CE) is a name whose use was pioneered by Buddhist scholars Erich Frauwallner, Giuseppe Tucci, and Hakuju Ui to distinguish one of the three founders of the Yogacara school of Buddhist philosophy, along with Asanga and Vasubandhu. Some scholars believe this Maitreya to be a historical person in India. The traditions themselves have held that it is referring to Maitreya, the future buddha.

Academic views
Scholars are divided in opinion whether the name refers to a historical human teacher of Asaṅga or to the bodhisattva Maitreya. Frauwallner, Tucci and Ui proposed this as a possibility, while Eric Obermiller and Fyodor Shcherbatskoy doubted the historicity of this figure.

Traditional view
The Buddhist traditions themselves have always held that Asaṅga received the texts in question from Maitreya directly in the Tuṣita heaven. Asaṅga is said to have spent many years in intense meditation, during which time tradition says that he often visited Tuṣita to receive teachings from the Maitreya. Heavens such as Tuṣita are said to be accessible through meditation. Xuanzang tells the account of these events:

Confusion over the idea of "supernaturally" visiting heavens may be due to the unfamiliarity of scholars with the Indian concept of heavens as being accessible through samādhi. Other advanced meditators recorded similar experiences of visiting Tuṣita Heaven at night. One such example of this is Hanshan Deqing during the Ming dynasty. In his autobiography, Hanshan describes the palace of Maitreya in Tuṣita, and hearing a lecture given by Bodhisattva Maitreya to a large group of his disciples.

Hanshan Deqing recalls the teaching given as the following:

Attributed works
The number of works attributed to him vary in the traditions of Tibetan Buddhism and Chinese Buddhism, but variously include:
 the Yogācārabhūmi śāstra, the encyclopaedic and definitive text of the Yogacara school
 the Mahāyānasūtrālamkārakārikā, which presents the Mahāyāna path from the Yogācāra perspective
 the Dharmadharmatāvibhāga, a short Yogācāra work discussing the distinction and correlation (vibhāga) between phenomena (dharma) and reality (dharmatā)
 the Madhyāntavibhāgakārikā, 112 verses that are a key work in Yogācāra philosophy
 the Abhisamayalankara, which summarizes the Prajnaparamita sūtras, which the Mādhyamaka school regards as presenting the ultimate truth
 the Ratnagotravibhāga, also known as the Uttāratantra śāstra, a compendium of the Buddha-nature literature

The last five works are often referred to collectively as the Five Dharmas of Maitreya, and their authorship is given variously to Maitreyanātha, Asaṅga or a combination thereof.

Notes

3rd-century Buddhist monks
4th-century Buddhist monks
Indian scholars of Buddhism
Yogacara scholars
Year of birth uncertain
350 deaths
Maitreya